The 1907 Holy Cross football team was an American football team that represented the College of the Holy Cross in the 1907 college football season.

In their first year under head coach Timothy F. Larkin, the Crusaders compiled a 1–7–2 record. Cleo A. O'Donnell was the team captain.

Holy Cross played its home games at the Fitton Field baseball stadium on the college campus in Worcester, Massachusetts.

Schedule

References

Holy Cross
Holy Cross Crusaders football seasons
Holy Cross football